The 2022 East Lothian Council election took place on 5 May 2022 on the same day as the 31 other Scottish local government elections. The election used the 5 wards created under the Local Governance (Scotland) Act 2004, with 18 councillors being elected. Each ward elected either 3 or 4 members, using the STV electoral system.

Scottish Labour retained control of the council, whilst the Scottish Greens won their first ever seat in East Lothian.

Aggregate results

Ward summary

|- class="unsortable" align="centre"
!rowspan=2 align="left"|Ward
!% 
!Cllrs
!%
!Cllrs
!%
!Cllrs
!%
!Cllrs
!%
!Cllrs
!%
!Cllrs
!rowspan=2|TotalCllrs
|- class="unsortable" align="center"
!colspan=2 bgcolor="" |SNP
!colspan=2 bgcolor="" |Lab
!colspan=2 bgcolor=""|Conservative
!colspan=2 bgcolor="" |Green
!colspan=2 bgcolor="" |Lib Dem
!colspan=2 bgcolor="white"|Others
|-
|align="left"|Musselburgh
|bgcolor="" |34.33
|bgcolor="" |1
|31.04
|2
|14.73
|0
|13.47
|1
|4.24
|0
|2.21
|0
|4
|-
|align="left"|Preston, Seton and Gosford
|29.78
|1
|bgcolor="" |39.67
|bgcolor="" |2
|20.46
|1
|5.78
|0
|3.29
|0
|1.02
|0
|4
|-
|align="left"|Tranent/Wallyford/Macmerry
|32.97
|2
|bgcolor="" |45.57
|bgcolor="" |2
|13.44
|0
|4.09
|0
|2.12
|0
|1.80
|0
|4
|-
|align="left"|North Berwick Coastal
|19.86
|1
|21.12
|1
|bgcolor="" |38.97
|bgcolor="" |1
|13.16
|0
|6.21
|0
|0.69
|0
|3
|-
|align="left"|Haddington and Lammermuir
|26.19
|1
|bgcolor="" |36.44
|bgcolor="" |2
|21.89
|1
|7.37
|0
|5.52
|0
|2.59
|0
|4
|-
|align="left"|Dunbar and East Linton
|bgcolor="" |26.78
|bgcolor="" |1
|25.25
|1
|21.45
|1
|15.13
|0
|10.13
|0
|1.26
|0
|3
|}

Ward results

Musselburgh

Preston Seton and Gosford

Tranent, Wallyford and Macmerry

North Berwick Coastal

Haddington and Lammermuir

Dunbar and East Linton

References

2022 Scottish local elections
East Lothian Council elections